The Cermak branch, formerly known as the Douglas branch, is a  long section of the Pink Line of the Chicago "L" system in Chicago, Illinois. It was built by the Metropolitan West Side Elevated west of the Loop. As of February 2013, it serves an average of 17,474 passengers every weekday. The branch serves the Near West Side, Pilsen, Lower West Side, South Lawndale, and North Lawndale neighborhoods of Chicago, and the west suburb Cicero, Illinois. The branch operates from 4:05 a.m. to 1:25 a.m., weekdays, and Saturdays from 5:05 a.m. to 1:25 a.m., and Sundays from 5:00 a.m. to 1:25 a.m., including holidays.

History

The branch started off with four stations and was the shortest of the Metropolitan West Side Elevated. Construction time was longer than in other sections.

On May 22, 1907, the Douglas Park branch was extended to 46th Avenue (Kenton Avenue), which is the Chicago city limits. The station was a few meters from the Hawthorne plant of the Western Electric which was one of the largest employers in the area of Chicago at the time.

On August 1, 1912, service was extended to 56th Avenue (Central Avenue) and extended again to Lombard Avenue exactly three years later. The final stretch on the branch was to Oak Park Avenue, in Berwyn, which opened on March 16, 1924.

Service to these areas was replaced by a bus route.

The stations at Roosevelt and Douglas Park were closed three months later. The new system changed the service and it was decided that all stations on the Douglas branch would now be "B" and the Congress branch would now be "A". In 1973, due to budget cuts, the 50th Avenue station closed.

Renovations
The poorly utilized  station was closed to accelerate service the following year. In 1993,  was rebuilt to provide access for passengers with disabilities and the CTA color-coded the lines, placing the Douglas branch as part of the Blue Line. In 1995, the A/B service was abandoned and all trains stop at every station, which does not affect the service of the stations on the Douglas branch. In 1996, the CTA changed the name of the branch to the Cermak branch, although Chicagoans still use the name "Douglas" to refer to the line. In 1998, the branch lost its 24-hour service, along with the Purple and Green lines. On September 10, 2001, the CTA began a $363 million renovation project of the branch which was completed on January 8, 2005. As of today, all eleven stations on the branch are ADA accessible.

Current
The current Pink Line route was assigned to the Douglas branch on June 25, 2006. The CTA ended Blue Line service on the Douglas branch on April 25, 2008.

Station listing

Image gallery

References

Chicago Transit Authority
Railway lines in Chicago
Railway lines opened in 1896